Liolaemus abdalai is a species of lizard in the family  Liolaemidae. It is native to Argentina.

References

abdalai
Reptiles described in 2012
Reptiles of Argentina
Taxa named by Andrés Sebastián Quinteros